Gettysburg National Cemetery is a United States national cemetery created for Union casualties from the Battle of Gettysburg in the American Civil War. The Battle of Gettysburg, which was fought between July 1 to 3, 1863, resulted in the largest number of casualties of any Civil War battle but also was considered the war's turning point, leading ultimately to the Union victory.

Gettysburg National Cemetery is located just outside Gettysburg Borough to the south, in Adams County, Pennsylvania. The land was part of the Gettysburg Battlefield, and the cemetery is within Gettysburg National Military Park administered by the National Park Service of the United States Department of the Interior.

Originally called Soldiers' National Cemetery, U.S. 16th President Abraham Lincoln (1809–1865, served 1861–1865), delivered his Gettysburg Address at the cemetery's consecration, November 19, 1863. That day is observed annually at the cemetery and in the town as
"Remembrance Day" with a parade/procession and memorial ceremonies by thousands of Civil War reenactor troops, both Union Army/United States Army and Confederate States Army and descendants heritage organizations led by the Sons of Union Veterans of the Civil War (SUVCW) and the Sons of Confederate Veterans (SCV).

The cemetery contains 3,512 interments from the Civil War, including the graves of 979 unknowns. It also has sections for veterans of the Spanish–American War (1898), World War I (1917–1918), and other wars, along with graves of the veterans' spouses and children. The total number of interments exceeds 6,000.

Battlefield monuments, memorials, and markers are scattered throughout the cemetery, and its stone walls, iron fences and gates, burial and section markers, and brick sidewalk are listed as contributing structures within Gettysburg Battlefield Historic District.

Description

The centerpiece of Gettysburg National Cemetery is Soldiers' National Monument (1869), a 60-foot-tall (18 m) granite monument designed by sculptor Randolph Rogers and architect George Keller. It is surrounded by concentric semicircles of graves, divided into 18 sections for Union states (1 each), a section for United States Regulars, and 3 sections for unknown soldiers.

Battlefield monuments within Gettysburg National Cemetery include those of the 1st United States Artillery Battery H, the 2nd Maine Battery, the 1st Massachusetts Battery (Cook's Battery), the 1st Minnesota Infantry, the 1st New Hampshire Light Battery, the 5th New York Independent Light Artillery, the 136th New York Volunteer Infantry, the 1st Ohio Battery H, the 55th Ohio Infantry, the 73rd Ohio Infantry, and the 75th Pennsylvania Infantry; and markers for the 1st Ohio Battery I and the 3rd Volunteer Brigade Artillery Reserve (Huntington's Brigade). Other monuments include the New York State Monument (1893), the Kentucky State Monument (1975), the Lincoln Address Monument (1912), the Friend to Friend Masonic Memorial (1994), the Major-General John F. Reynolds Statue (1872), and the Major-General Charles Collis Memorial (1906).

History

Reinterments
Union remains were transferred from the Gettysburg Battlefield burial plots (e.g., on Cemetery Hill) as well as local church cemeteries, field hospital burial sites , including Camp Letterman and the Rock Creek-White Run Union Hospital Complex, the USA General Hospital, York, Pa., and the Valley of Death where unburied soldiers decomposed in place. Samuel Weaver, as "Superintendent of the exhuming of the bodies", personally observed the contractor's workers opening graves, placing remains in coffins, and burying them in the cemetery, and at least 1 reinterment was from the neighboring Evergreen Cemetery (Adams County, Pennsylvania).

Consecration

Chronology

References

Further reading

External links
 National Park Service: Gettysburg National Cemetery
 Finding Aid for Correspondence and Printed Material on Gettysburg National Cemetery, Special Collections, Linderman Library, Lehigh University
 The Soldiers' National Cemetery at Gettysburg (1874) by John Russell Bartlett
 
 

American Civil War cemeteries
National Cemetery
Cemetery Hill
Cemeteries established in the 1860s
Cemeteries in Pennsylvania
United States national cemeteries
1863 establishments in Pennsylvania